The 1984 Yonex All England Open Championships was the 74th edition held in 1984, at Wembley Arena, London.

Final results

Men's singles

Seeds

Section 1

Section 2

Women's singles

Seeds

Section 1

Section 2

References
 Results

All England Open Badminton Championships
All England Open
All England
All England Open Badminton Championships in London
All England Open Badminton Championships
All England Open Badminton Championships